Glogova is a village in the municipality of Bratunac, Bosnia and Herzegovina, where on 9 May 1992, in the early days of the Bosnian War (1992–95), 65 Bosnian Muslim civilians were killed in a Glogova massacre ordered by Miroslav Deronjić, President of the Bratunac Municipal Board of the Serbian Democratic Party (SDS) of Bosnia and Herzegovina.

References

Populated places in Bratunac